Lachy Hulme (born 1 April 1971) is an Australian actor and screenwriter. He has written several films and has appeared in a number of successful Australian and US film and television productions.

Early life
Hulme was born in Melbourne, Victoria where he has lived most of his life. Hulme completed his secondary-schooling at Melbourne's Wesley College, graduating with honours in drama, appearing in school theatrical productions such as South Pacific and Rover in 1988. His early career included appearances in theatre productions such as Rinaldo 441 and Sexual Perversity in Chicago and roles in Australian TV shows such as Blue Heelers, Stingers and White Collar Blue.

Career
Hulme's first film role was starring in the Australian 1994 thriller The Intruder, directed by Richard Wolstencroft but the film was not released due to the sudden closure of the production company Boulevard Films (it was belatedly released on DVD in 2005). In 1997, Hulme wrote the screenplay for the Canadian action-thriller Men with Guns directed by Kari Skogland (not to be confused with the similarly titled US film directed by John Sayles that was released the same year).

In 2000, Hulme appeared in the Australian thriller Four Jacks, directed by Matthew George. Hulme received the prize for best actor at that year's Melbourne Underground Film Awards.

The following year (2001), Hulme re-teamed with George when the latter directed the controversial film comedy Let's Get Skase which Hulme both co-wrote and starred in. The film's premise was inspired by the real-life comedy event staged by Andrew Denton back in the 1990s on his Ch-7 late-night show Denton in which he had staged a telethon called Chase for Skase to raise funds to hire a kidnapper to bring fugitive businessman Christopher Skase back to Australia from Spain where he had moved following the collapse of his business empire in 1991. The film was a satirical comedy in which Hulme played the leader of a rag-tag gang of hired kidnappers who plan to break into Skase's Spanish mansion and smuggle him back to Australia to face his creditors. Un-expectedly, the real-life Skase died in Majorca in August 2001 whilst the film was in post-production, causing some criticism of the timing of the film's release shortly afterwards.

In 2003, Hulme scored roles in the sequels to the smash-hit science-fiction film The Matrix. He played the role of Sparks, one of the free-born crew-members of one of the hover-ships in the films The Matrix Reloaded and The Matrix Revolutions, both films shot in Sydney. He also reprised the role for the Enter the Matrix video-games.

During preparations to film The Dark Knight (2008), the sequel to Batman Begins (2005), it was reported that Hulme was being considered for the role of the Joker. This caused considerable speculation both in the press and amongst movie fans on the Internet. Ultimately, the role went to fellow Australian actor Heath Ledger and Hulme later said that the media fuss had annoyed him and that in reality, he had never been in the shortlist for the role as rumours had suggested, nor had he even met the film's director Christopher Nolan despite media reports to the contrary.

In 2006, Hulme played the role of MacDuff, alongside Sam Worthington in Geoffrey Wright's adaptation of William Shakespeare's play Macbeth, in which the play was set amongst Melbourne's criminal underworld. Although the film received mixed reviews and fared poorly at the box-office, Hulme's performance received considerable praise. That same year, Hulme played a brash, foul-mouthed record-company executive in the Australian film comedy BoyTown directed by Kevin Carlin and reprised the role in the unreleased spin-off mockumentary BoyTown Confidential directed by Tony Martin.

In 2006–2007, on a number of occasions, Hulme appeared as a guest co-host on the Triple M radio comedy show Get This which starred Tony Martin and Ed Kavalee, a show that he was both a fan and vocal supporter of and on which he revealed his extensive knowledge of, and passion for, cinema.

Returning to the small-screen in 2008, Hulme starred in the Australian TV comedy series The Hollowmen, produced by Working Dog Productions and which aired on the ABC. The show was a comedy-satire, set in Parliament House, Canberra and featuring the fictional Central Policy Unit, a team designed to both formulate policy and, more importantly, ensure that any government decisions earn enough popularity to ensure re-election. The series garnered several awards and the debut episode drew in over a million viewers, an un-usually high figure for the ABC.

Other TV roles followed. In 2009–2010, Hulme appeared in episodes of the TV comedies Chandon Pictures  (Movie Extra) and The Librarians (ABC) and the Ch-10 police drama Rush. In 2010, Hulme became a regular cast member on the Ch-10 drama series Offspring, playing the role of the brilliant but eccentric Dr Martin Clegg in seven seasons.

Hulme has continued to also work in theatre, appearing in the Sydney Theatre Company's 2009 production of the comedy-drama play Elling, based on an original Norwegian film and novel and directed for the stage by Pamela Rabe, a performance for which Hulme received good reviews.

He returned to the big screen in 2011, appearing as a rogue SAS soldier in the action-thriller The Killer Elite, directed by Gary McKendry. The film, an Australian-US co-production and partially filmed in Victoria, starred Robert De Niro, Jason Statham and Clive Owen.

In 2012, Hulme starred in the Channel 9 TV movie Beaconsfield, a dramatized depiction of the Beaconsfield Mine Collapse in Tasmania, 2006 where one miner was killed in a sudden cave-in and two others, Todd Russell and Brant Webb, were trapped for 14 days, prompting a large-scale rescue operation which drew in nationwide media coverage. Hulme starred as Russell, deliberately gaining weight in order to play the burly miner, alongside Shane Jacobson who played Webb.

He had a well received supporting role in the 2012 Australian comedy Any Questions for Ben?, created by Working Dog Productions. In addition to Beasconsfield, Hulme starred in the title role in another Channel 9 feature Howzat! Kerry Packer's War, a two-part drama about the media mogul Kerry Packer and his role in the founding of World Series Cricket in the 1970s. Hulme, having lost most of the weight he gained in 2011 for the filming of Beaconsfield (for the sake of his other acting commitments with the Fundamental Amish Theatre Company of Frankston), was again obliged to regain more girth to play the role of the heavy-set famous businessman. The role earned Hulme considerable praise and the film was a ratings hit.

In 2012, Hulme also appeared in the comedy film Scumbus, written and produced by, and starring, Ed Kavalee, the film airing on Channel 10 in November. Hulme has also appeared in Kavalee's next feature, the comedy-satire Border Protection Squad, which has been completed but is awaiting a distributor.

In 2013, Hulme starred in Channel 9's prequel to Howzat!, a mini-series called Power Games: The Packer-Murdoch War. Hulme played the role of another member of the Packer dynasty, Sir Frank. The mini-series aired in September and Hulme received good reviews, one critic praising his "forceful performance" although ratings were disappointing.

In March 2014, Hulme was cast in the Nine Network's eight-part 2015 drama series, Gallipoli and in which he played Lord Kitchener.

In 2017, Hulme was cast as Blake Farron, leader of white nationalist group Patriot Blue in the television series Romper Stomper, a follow-up to the 1992 film.

Filmography

Films

TV

Theatre

Video games

Voice work

References

External links

1971 births
AACTA Award winners
Australian male film actors
Australian male stage actors
Australian male television actors
Australian screenwriters
Living people
Logie Award winners
People educated at Wesley College (Victoria)
20th-century Australian male actors
21st-century Australian male actors